Kunkle may refer to:

 Kunkle, Ohio, census-designated place in Williams County, Ohio, United States
 Kunkle, Pennsylvania, unincorporated community in Luzerne County, Pennsylvania, United States
 Connie Kunkle, American television personality and singer

Kunkletown, Pennsylvania, unincorporated community, United States

See also
 Kunkel (surname)